The  is Japanese aerial lift line in Ōmihachiman, Shiga, operated by Ohmi Railway. Opened in 1962, the line climbs Mount Hachiman, where there was Hachiman Castle built by Toyotomi Hidetsugu. The observatory has a view of Lake Biwa, as well as the city of Ōmihachiman, known for its traditional buildings lasting from Edo period.

Basic data
System: Aerial tramway, 3 cables
Cable length: 
Vertical interval: 
Passenger capacity per a cabin: 25
Cabins: 2
Stations: 2
Duration of one-way trip: 4 minutes

See also
List of aerial lifts in Japan

External links
 Official website

Aerial tramways in Japan
1962 establishments in Japan
Ōmihachiman, Shiga